The CAF Civity is a platform of regional passenger trains which is manufactured by Spanish rolling stock manufacturer Construcciones y Auxiliar de Ferrocarriles. Available as both diesel, electric and battery-electric multiple unit, the Civity was first launched in 2010 and received its first order two years later.

As of 2021, 251 Civity units have been constructed, with a further 254 on order. The United Kingdom is the largest customer of the platform with a total of 216 units ordered.

Description
The Civity is a modular platform available in four variants, which are diesel, diesel-electric, electric and bi/dual mode. Most variants of the Civity platform, with the exception of the Civity UK, have shared bogies and a low floor.

Diesel
As of 2018, the diesel variant has only been ordered by operators in the United Kingdom (Northern, West Midlands Trains and Transport for Wales), with these units being constructed in either two, three or four-car formations.

Electric
The electric variant is capable of operating on 1500 V or 3000 V DC power supplies with a pick-up shoe or 15 kV or 25 kV AC power supplies with a pantograph.

Operations

Australia
In February 2019, Transport for New South Wales signed a contract with Momentum Trains PPP to supply 117 Civity bi mode (diesel and electric supply) carriages, a new maintenance centre in Dubbo and a maintenance contract as part of the Regional Rail Project. The new trains will replace the XPT (19 power cars and 60 carriages), Xplorer (23 carriages) and Endeavour (28 carriages) trains. The 117 new carriages  will make up 10 diesel-electric trainsets for use on long-distance services linking Sydney, Melbourne and Brisbane, plus nine short and 10 long multiple-units for regional routes, a total of 29 trains. The trains are due to commence in service in 2023.

Germany 
In June 2021, the Verkehrsverbund Rhein-Ruhr (VRR) and the Nahverkehr Westfalen-Lippe (NWL) announced that CAF, using its Civity platform, had been selected to build and maintain for 30 years, 63 battery electric multiple units (48 long and 15 short version) for the Niederrhein-Münsterland regional train network, comprising the RE10, RB37 (lot 1), RE14, RE44, RB31, RB36, RB41 and RB43 (lot 2) train services in the state of North Rhine-Westphalia. The fleet will be owned by the VRR and NWL and will be made available to DB Regio (lot 1) and the other  train operating company that has yet to be selected (lot 2). The operations on the individual services are due to start between December 2025 and 2028.
In 2022, the Nahverkehr Westfalen-Lippe ordered an additional 10 long units for operation on the RB68 (Münster - Sendenhorst) and RB76 (Verl - Gütersloh - Harsewinkel) services from December 2025.

Italy
In 2010, the Italian region of Friuli Venezia Giuila placed an order with CAF for eight ETR 563 five-car units for Trenitalia. Four more units were subsequently ordered, with these units capable of operating services into Slovenia and Austria, with these being designated as ETR 564 units. The units were delayed into service as they could not be approved.

Five four-car ETR 452 trains have been built for Ferrotramviaria, a regional train operator in Bari, Apulia. They have been in use since 2014 and 2015.

Montenegro
Three Class 6111 three-car EMUs were delivered to Željeznički prevoz Crne Gore (ŽPCG), the national railway company of Montenegro, specifically to serve the Podgorica-Nikšić railway, cutting travel time to only 50 minutes. The first of the new trains started with service on 13 July 2013.

Netherlands
In 2014, Nederlandse Spoorwegen (NS) placed a €510 million order 118 Civity sets. These new trains, which will consist of three and four car formations, will replace the NS SGMm sets. The train is known as the Sprinter New Generation (SNG) by the NS. A mock-up of an SNG was presented in September 2015, featuring sockets, recycling bins and a toilet. An additional 88 sets were ordered in December 2018, with deliveries expected to continue through 2023.

Sweden 
The public transport agency's of Jönköpings län, Kronobergs län and Kalmar län have made a joint order for 20 electric units (EMU) and 8 units that can be powered either by an external electricity supply or by using the onboard diesel engine (BMU). The contract also contain an option for another 19 EMUs and 7 BMUs through the leasing company Transitio. The trains will be of Civity Nordic version, designed for operation at temperatures of between -40 and +40 °C and are set to arrive 2024-27 and will replace the X11s, X14s, Itinos and Y2s currently running in the regions. The maximum speed of EMUs will be 200 km/h, that of the BMUs will be 200 km/h in electric mode and only 140 km/h in diesel mode.

United Kingdom

Northern Trains
In January 2016, Arriva Rail North placed an order for 98 (later increased to 101) units, with the majority of these trains due to operate on the company's Northern Connect regional express services (now under new operator Northern Trains). The order breakdown is for 58 (originally 55)  diesel multiple units (two and three-car) and 43  electric multiple units (three and four-car). All of these trains were planned to gradually enter service throughout 2019.

In early 2018, it was revealed that there is an option for an undisclosed number of additional carriages. There is also a provision available to extend the four car Class 331 units to five carriages in the future.

The extra three Class 195 units were ordered in November 2018.

TransPennine Express
CAF built twelve  five-car electric multiple units for TransPennine Express for its West Coast Main Line services, which operate from Liverpool and Manchester Airport to Glasgow and Edinburgh. These units were due to be delivered between 2018 and 2019, replacing the four-car /4 units which were previously used on these services.

West Midlands Trains
It was announced in late 2017 that CAF will also supply 26  diesel multiple units for West Midlands Trains, which will be in two-car and four-car formations. They will operate services for the company's West Midlands Railway sub-brand.

Transport for Wales
In June 2018 it was announced that KeolisAmey Wales had ordered 51 two-car and 26 three-car diesel multiple Civitys, to be based at Chester and Machynlleth depots. These have since received the TOPS designation Class 197.

Cancelled orders

Latvia
In 2012, Latvian railway operator Pasažieru vilciens placed a €400 million order for 34 electric and seven diesel-electric multiple units. The order also included a 30-year maintenance plan for the units. The order was subsequently cancelled, with no units built.

Fleet details

See also
 Siemens Desiro
 Stadler FLIRT
 Bombardier Talent
 Alstom Coradia
 Pesa Elf
 Skoda 7Ev
 HZ series 6112

References

External links 

 Official CAF website

CAF multiple units
Articulated passenger trains
British Rail diesel multiple units
British Rail electric multiple units
Train-related introductions in 2012